The 2021 season is Tanjong Pagar United FC's 16th season at the top level of Singapore football. The club will also compete in the Singapore Cup.

Squad

Singapore Premier League

U21 Squad

Coaching staff

Transfers

In

Pre-season

Mid-season

Loan In

Out 
Pre-season

Mid-season

Loan Out 
Pre-season

Pre-season

Extension / Retained

Promoted

Friendlies

Pre-Season Friendly

Mid-season friendlies

Team statistics

Appearances and goals 

Numbers in parentheses denote appearances as substitute.

Competitions

Overview

Singapore Premier League

Singapore Cup

See also 
 2020 Tanjong Pagar United FC season

Notes

References 

Tanjong Pagar United FC
Tanjong Pagar United FC